Bassi Falls is a waterfall in the Sierra Nevada mountain range, to the west of Lake Tahoe in the El Dorado County, California.  It falls for 109 ft. It is off of a 5-mile 4x4 road which leads to a trailhead just 1/2 mile from the falls.

Landforms of El Dorado County, California
Waterfalls of California
Waterfalls of the Sierra Nevada (United States)
Tourist attractions in El Dorado County, California